Nicolaes de Kemp (1574 – 1647), was a Dutch Golden Age painter.

Biography
Nicolaes de Kemp was born in Haarlem and became the pupil of Hendrik Cornelisz Vroom. He is known for marines.
He died in Haarlem.

References

External links

1574 births
1647 deaths
Dutch Golden Age painters
Dutch male painters
Artists from Haarlem